Lea Webb is an American politician serving as a member of the New York State Senate for the 52nd district. Elected in November 2022, she assumed office on January 1, 2023.

Early life and education 
Webb is a native of the Southern Tier region of New York. She earned an associate degree in liberal arts and sciences from SUNY Broome Community College and a Bachelor of Science in neuroscience from Binghamton University.

Career 
From 2004 to 2006, Webb worked for the Mothers and Babies Perinatal Network in Binghamton, New York. She served as an organizer for Citizen Action of New York and was elected to the Binghamton City Council in 2008. Webb was elected to the New York State Senate in November 2022.

References 

Living people
New York (state) Democrats
People from Binghamton, New York
SUNY Broome Community College alumni
Binghamton University alumni
New York (state) state senators
Year of birth missing (living people)